Charyshsky (masculine), Charyshskaya (feminine), or Charyshskoye (neuter) is the name of three rural localities in Altai Krai, Russia:
Charyshsky (rural locality), a settlement in Krasnoshchyokovsky District
Charyshkoye, Charyshsky District, Altai Krai, a selo in Charyshsky District
Charyshkoye, Ust-Kalmansky District, Altai Krai, a selo in Ust-Kalmansky District

References